Clinton Downtown Historic District is a national historic district located at Clinton, Vermillion County, Indiana.  The district encompasses 46 contributing buildings, 1 contributing site, and 1 contributing object in the central business district of Clinton.  It developed between about 1880 and 1935 and includes representative examples of Italianate, Romanesque Revival, and Bungalow / American Craftsman style architecture. Notable contributing resources include the C. & E. I Passenger Station (c. 1910), Bogart Park and Claude Matthews bust / memorial, Scott-Martin Block (1907), H.H. Wisehart Building (1915), Mark W. Lyday Building (c. 1910), Ford Agency Building (c. 1910), and C. & E. I Freight Depot (1912).

It was listed on the National Register of Historic Places in 2000.

References

Historic districts on the National Register of Historic Places in Indiana
Italianate architecture in Indiana
Romanesque Revival architecture in Indiana
Bungalow architecture in Indiana
Buildings and structures in Vermillion County, Indiana
National Register of Historic Places in Vermillion County, Indiana